Scymnus barberi, is a species of beetle found in the family Coccinellidae. It is found in North America.

References 

Coccinellidae
Beetles described in 1976